Lamont B. Steptoe (born 1949 Pittsburgh, Pennsylvania) is an American poet, photographer and publisher. Steptoe edited and published three collections of the late South African poet and activist, Dennis Brutus, under Whirlwind Press.

Life
Steptoe was born and raised in Pittsburgh, Pennsylvania. He graduated from Temple University. He was a Vietnam veteran, and founder of Whirlwind Press.

Awards
 2005 American Book Award
 1999 Literary Fellow for the Pennsylvania Council on the Arts
 2002 Kuntu Writers Workshop Lifetime Achievement Award in Poetry, from founders Rob Penny and August Wilson
 2014 Ambassador of the Republic of Užupis

Works
"Update on the Disembodied", Longshot Vol 22
 
 Mad Minute, Whirlwind Press, 1993
 
 Cat Fish and Neckbone Jazz
 
 
 Common Salt 
 Trinkets and Beads
 Crimson river: poems , Slash & Burn, 1984

References

External links
"Interview with Lamont Steptoe", Tilt-a-Whirl, Jordan Green
"Lamont B. Steptoe", Exit 50, June 30, 2005

1949 births
Living people
American male poets
Writers from Pittsburgh
United States Army personnel of the Vietnam War
American Book Award winners
United States Army soldiers